Sophia Elsie Kiely (born 2000) is an English Olivier Award-winning child actress who played the titular role in Matilda the Musical. Kiely shared the role with Cleo Demetriou, Kerry Ingram, and Eleanor Worthington Cox.

Career 
Kiely played Matilda at the Cambridge Theatre in the West End debut of Matilda the Musical. After rehearsing the show since August, she made her debut on 27 October 2011. In April 2012 Sophia won an Olivier Award for Best Actress in a Musical along with her co-stars. She made a special appearance as Matilda for West End Live in Trafalgar Square, performing "Naughty".

Theatre credits

Awards

References 

Living people
Laurence Olivier Award winners
2000 births
English stage actresses
English child actresses
21st-century English actresses